The 1924 Villanova Wildcats football team represented the Villanova University during the 1924 college football season. The Wildcats team captain was John Savers.

Schedule

References

Villanova
Villanova Wildcats football seasons
Villanova Wildcats football